Giorgos Georgiou is a Cypriot politician currently serving as a Member of the European Parliament for the Progressive Party of Working People.

On 15 September 2022, he was one of 16 MEPs who voted against condemning President Daniel Ortega of Nicaragua for human rights violations, in particular the arrest of Bishop Rolando Álvarez.

References

Living people
MEPs for Cyprus 2019–2024
Members of the House of Representatives (Cyprus)
Progressive Party of Working People MEPs
Progressive Party of Working People politicians
1963 births